Heybroek is a surname. Notable people with the surname include:

Hans M. Heybroek (1927–2022), Dutch botanist
Inge Heybroek (1915–1956), Dutch field hockey player
Folke Heybroek (1913–1983), Dutch expressionist artist

Dutch-language surnames